Angel hair may refer to:

Food
 Capellini pasta, known as "angel hair" in English
 Fios de ovos, a Portuguese sweet dish
 Cabell d'àngel, a Catalan-Spanish sweet dish

Other
 Angel hair (folklore), an ethereal substance said to emanate from UFOs
 Cuscuta or dodder, a genus of plants
 "Angel Hair", a song on the Black Dresses album Peaceful as Hell (2020)
 Angel Hair, a poetry publisher operated by Lewis Warsh